The Old French Seven Sages cycle is a cycle of seven prose romances based on the legend of the Seven Sages of Rome. The seven are:
Roman des Sept Sages
Roman de Marques de Rome
Roman de Laurin
Roman de Cassidorus
Roman de Helcanus
Roman de Pelyarmenus
Roman de Kanor

The Roman des Sept Sages and Roman de Marques de Rome can be found in the Chansonnier d'Arras.

Bibliography

Old French texts